Rotating bookmarks were a kind of bookmark used in medieval Europe. They were attached to a string, along which a marker could be slid up and down to mark a precise level on the page. Attached to the marker was a rotating disk that could indicate the column (usually numbered one to four, indicating the two columns on the left-hand page, and the two columns on the right-hand page).

About 30 such rotating bookmarks have been recorded in libraries in continental Europe, and another half a dozen in England.

References
J. Destrez, L’outillage des copistes du XIIIe et du XIVe siècles, in Aus der Geisteswelt des Mittelalters, Martin Grabmann festschrift, 1935, 19–34
R. Emms, Medieval Rotating Column-Indicators, Transactions of the Cambridge Bibliographical Society, XII, 2001, 179–l-84).

External links
 History of Bookmarks

Book terminology